The 1964 Oklahoma Sooners football team represented the University of Oklahoma as a member of the Big Eight Conference during the 1964 NCAA University Division football season.They Led by were first-year head coach Gomer Jones the Sooner compiled an overall record of 6–4–1 with a mark of 5–1–1 in conference play, placing second in the Big Eight. Oklahoma was invited to the  Gator Bowl, where the Sooner lost to Florida State. The team played home games at Oklahoma Memorial Stadium in Norman, Oklahoma. 

In the second game of the season, on September 26, the Sooners where upset by at home by the USC, 40–14.

Schedule

Rankings

Postseason

NFL draft
The following players were drafted into the National Football League on November 28, 1964. Players were offered contracts but were declared ineligible to play in the Gator Bowl if they signed them before the game, as was the case with Ralph Neely.

References

Oklahoma
Oklahoma Sooners football seasons
Oklahoma Sooners football